Raymond T. Chen (born 1968) is a United States circuit judge of the United States Court of Appeals for the Federal Circuit.

Biography
He joined the intellectual property law firm of Knobbe, Martens, Olson & Bear in Irvine, California. He prosecuted patents and represented clients in intellectual property litigation at that firm. From 1996 to 1998, he served as a technical assistant at the United States Court of Appeals for the Federal Circuit, performing the functions of a staff attorney. From 1998 to 2013, he served in the United States Patent and Trademark Office as an assistant solicitor and was promoted to Solicitor in 2008. He represented the USPTO before the Federal Circuit, personally arguing twenty cases, including In re Bilski, In re Nuijten, and In re Comiskey. In that role, he issued guidance to patent examiners, advised the agency on legal and policy issues and helped promulgate regulations. He has co-chaired the Patent and Trademark Office Committee of the Federal Circuit Bar Association and is a member of the Advisory Council for the Federal Circuit.

Federal Circuit service

On February 7, 2013, President Barack Obama nominated Chen to serve as a United States Circuit Judge of the United States Court of Appeals for the Federal Circuit, to the seat vacated by Judge Richard Linn who assumed senior status on October 31, 2012. His nomination was reported by the Senate Judiciary Committee on May 16, 2013, by a voice vote. The Senate confirmed Chen's nomination on August 1, 2013 by a 97–0 vote. He received his commission on August 2, 2013. He assumed office on August 5, 2013. Chen is also the second Asian American Judge to be on the Federal Circuit, the first being Shiro Kashiwa (1982–1986).

See also
List of Asian American jurists

References

External links

1968 births
Living people
21st-century American judges
American jurists of Chinese descent
American jurists of Taiwanese descent
American lawyers of Chinese descent
American people of Taiwanese descent
Judges of the United States Court of Appeals for the Federal Circuit
New York University School of Law alumni
Lawyers from New York City
UCLA Henry Samueli School of Engineering and Applied Science alumni
United States court of appeals judges appointed by Barack Obama